KCTS-TV (channel 9) is a PBS member television station in Seattle, Washington, United States, owned by Cascade Public Media. Its studios are located at the northeast corner of Seattle Center adjacent to the Space Needle, and its transmitter is located on Capitol Hill in Seattle.

KCTS-TV is the primary PBS member station for the Seattle–Tacoma market alongside Tacoma-licensed KBTC-TV (channel 28), owned by Bates Technical College; through PBS' Program Differentiation Plan, KCTS-TV carries the majority (75%) of the network's programs, with KBTC-TV carrying the remaining 25%.

Originally owned and operated by the University of Washington, KCTS-TV became a community licensee in 1987. The station's ownership merged with Crosscut.com to form Cascade Public Media in 2016.

KYVE (channel 47) in Yakima operates as a semi-satellite of KCTS-TV, serving as the PBS member station for the western portion of the Yakima–Tri-Cities market. KYVE's transmitter is located on Ahtanum Ridge.

History

KCTS first went on the air on December 7, 1954, broadcasting from the campus of the University of Washington, the station's original licensee, and using equipment donated by KING-TV owner Dorothy Bullitt. Channel 9 was a sister station to KUOW-FM, which the University of Washington put on the air two years earlier. It was originally to have gone on the air under the callsign KUOW-TV, but it would instead assume the callsign KCTS (meaning Community Television Service) months before its sign-on on May 13, 1954.

During the 1950s and 1960s, KCTS primarily supplied classroom instructional programs used in Washington State's K–12 schools, plus National Educational Television (NET) programs. Outside of schoolrooms, KCTS' audience among the general public was somewhat limited, and most programming was in black-and-white until the mid-1970s (although the station did install color capability in 1967).

In 1970, NET was absorbed into the newly-created Public Broadcasting Service (PBS), which commenced broadcasting on October 5. As a PBS member station, KCTS began offering a vastly enhanced scope of programming for the general public, including British programming.

Thanks to a major fundraising drive during the mid-1980s, KCTS moved to its present location on the Seattle Center campus in October 1986; shortly after, in 1987, the University of Washington spun off KCTS, and the station became a community licensee, thus separating it from KUOW-FM.

KCTS is seen throughout southwestern British Columbia on local cable systems, as well as across Canada on the Bell Satellite TV and Shaw Direct satellite providers, as well as on many other Canadian cable TV systems. According to KCTS, around 2 million viewers from Canada tune in each week. KCTS receives substantial financial support from its far-flung Canadian audience as well as from viewers in Washington State.

In January 2016, as part of a broader strategy to redefine itself as a content provider for various other platforms other than television, the name of the licensee, KCTS Television became Cascade Public Media; its properties included KCTS-TV, Crosscut, a non-profit daily news site, and Spark Public. Cascade Public Media currently consists of KCTS, Crosscut and Piranha Partners.

In July 2022, Cascade Public Media purchased Childhaven's longtime facility in First Hill for $23 million and announced that it would move its operations there by the end of 2023; the organization stated on its website that the city of Seattle declined to renew the 40-year ground lease for the Seattle Center facility. It retained architectural firm JPC Architects, general contractor Abbott Construction, and project manager OAC Services as part of a capital campaign to purchase and renovate the property.

KYVE history

In 1994, KCTS merged with KYVE, which has served central Washington since November 1, 1962. However, this was not the first time that the two stations had partnered together; during the early 1960s KYVE's engineers switched to and from KCTS' signal until the station's owners, the Yakima Board of Education, got enough funding for the station to be self-supporting. The station became a community licensee in 1984, but found the going difficult until its merger with KCTS. KYVE did produce a few local programs, including the KYVE Apple Bowl with host Tony Leita, a high school quiz competition; Northwest Outdoors with Wally Pease, an outdoors program; and Country Roads with Gwyn Gilmore, a showcase of country music videos.

During the mid-1990s to the early 2000s, some programs included a combined "KCTS/KYVE" visual bug in the lower-right corner of the screen, indicating they were simulcast to both markets. However, since the early 2000s, KYVE has largely been a straight simulcast of KCTS, so the screen bug was dropped. Combined, the two stations serve 2.4 million people, accounting for almost two-thirds of Washington state's population.

Its former studios were located at Braeburn Hall at Yakima Valley Community College. But since the start of the millennium, local origination was severely reduced, and eventually, Braeburn Hall was torn down. KYVE later moved to a small office on 2nd Street (at the bottom of the Larson Building). This office is now home to the ticket office and administration for the Yakima Valley Pippins baseball team, and aside from the Ahtanum Ridge transmitter and the legal hourly station ID, KYVE no longer has any presence in Yakima.

Programming
KCTS is perhaps best known for producing/distributing the popular PBS Kids show Bill Nye the Science Guy, as well as other programs such as Students by Nature (not a PBS-distributed program), The Miracle Planet, cooking shows by Nick Stellino, Chefs A' Field, and the annual televised high school academic competition KYVE Apple Bowl.

KCTS was among a number of PBS member stations to air the controversial "Sugartime!" episode of Postcards from Buster, a spinoff of Arthur about a cartoon rabbit named Buster Baxter, who travels the country with his father and interacts with children from different cultures and in different family structures. The episode had been removed from PBS Kids Go!'s national broadcast schedule after PBS received a critical letter from then-newly-appointed Education Secretary Margaret Spellings, who was upset that Buster was visiting a Vermont family headed by two women. WGBH, the Boston-based PBS affiliate and original producer of the program, subsequently made the episode available to stations that still wished to air it on an individual basis.

Technical information

Subchannels
The stations' digital signals are multiplexed:

Analog-to-digital conversion
KCTS-TV shut down its analog signal, over VHF channel 9, on June 12, 2009, as part of the federally mandated transition from analog to digital television. The station's digital signal relocated from its pre-transition UHF channel 41 to VHF channel 9.

Translators

References

External links
 KCTS 9
 KYVE
 History KCTS from 1954 through 2003 (Seattle Times)
 Richard J. Meyer papers, at the University of Maryland Libraries. He was a manager of KCTS from 1972 to 1982 and helped in updating equipment, securing a larger budget for the station, and increasing community representation in the show with new employees from the local community.

PBS member stations
Peabody Award winners
Television channels and stations established in 1954
CTS-TV
University of Washington
1954 establishments in Washington (state)